The Arrival of Averill is a 1992 Austrian drama film directed by Michael Schottenberg. It was screened in the Un Certain Regard section at the 1992 Cannes Film Festival.

Cast
 Claude Aufaure
 Maria Bill
 Fabio Carfora
 Umberto Conte
 Andras Jones as Averill
 Elisabeth Kaza
 Michael Kroecher

References

External links

1992 films
1992 drama films
1990s German-language films
Films directed by Michael Schottenberg
Austrian drama films